Mansour Sattari (also Romanized as Mansoor Sattari) (19 May 1948 – 5 January 1995) was an Iranian Air Force Brigadier general.

After serving his compulsory military service in the Army Artillery branch, he joined the Iranian Military Academy and entered the Imperial Iranian Air Force in 1965 in the Ground Force branch. In 1971 he was sent to United States to attend a course in Advanced Radar Control and Battle Management. Upon his return to Iran he was employed as a Radar Defence Control Officer. He implemented many innovative plans to improve radar and counterattack systems that was learnt from the U.S. Air Forces, which proved helpful in disabling offensive capacities of the Iraqi Air Force during the Iran-Iraq War. In 1983 Mansour Sattari was appointed Deputy Operations Officer for the Islamic Republic of Iran Air Force counterattack headquarters, and in 1985, as the Deputy Planning Officer of IRIAF. In 1986, after reaching the rank of Colonel, he was appointed the Commander-in-Chief of the Islamic Republic of Iran Air Force. He held this position until his death.
On January 5, 1995 an Islamic Republic of Iran Air Force (IRIAF) JetStar crashed near Isfahan during an emergency landing, killing all 12 on board including General Mansour Sattari, commander of the IRIAF. He was 46 years old.

The Iranian Sattar missile and Shahid Sattari Aeronautical University were named after him.

Childhood 
He was born on 16 June 1948 in the village of Valiabad Qarchak in a middle-class family. His father's name was Hasan Sattari and a poet. His father died when he was nine years old. Mansour Sattari's father established a school and a Husseiniya.

Film 
Mansour's film with the former name of Ouj 110 is a film directed and written by Siavash Sarmadi and produced by Jalil Shabani, produced in 2009 and released in 2021. This film is participating in the 39th Fajr Film Festival. This film narrates the life of Mansour Sattari.

Book 
The most important books published on the biography of Air Marshal Mansour Sattari, are as follows:
 The Devotee of Love, a collection of memoirs, a review of Air Marshal Mansour Sattari's life, IRIAF Organization for Islamic Ethics in Politics 1996
 Legends, collected by Khalil abdolhoseini, Shahed Publication, 2001
 Eternal Models, by Abasalt rasooli, Shahed Publication 2006
 A Man Clothed with Clouds (based on the life of Mansour Sattari), by Hamid Tawabi Lawasani, Office of Resistance Literature and Art of the Shahed Publication, 2006
 Velvet of the Heavenly, by Shahed Publications, 2007
 The Man, by Shamsi Khowsrawi, NAHAJA Publications

References

External links 

 mansoor sattari official website

Commanders of Islamic Republic of Iran Air Force
Recipients of the Order of Fath
1948 births
1995 deaths
Islamic Republic of Iran Army brigadier generals
Islamic Republic of Iran Army personnel of the Iran–Iraq War